Lebanese Hip Hop is a pioneering movement in Arabic hip hop as Lebanese youth were among the first to be affected by hip hop culture.
Arabic hip hop has received Western media attention, but most Lebanese rappers think that there is still a lack of local interest in their music. Hip hop in Lebanon is both an art form and a stage for artists to voice their alternative discourse in the public sphere. 

In 2001 Erhab records label introduced gangster rap to the Lebanese hiphop scene. The label established a recording studio in 2008 in Lebanon's central prison Roumieh Prison , They released many singles and albums featuring inmates.

Roots and Significance 

The hip hop culture is grounded in African American oral tradition, but, as communities around the world tend to do, the Lebanese hip hop scene is accommodated to the local context. According to member of local hip hop band Fareeq el Atrash,

"[hip hop] always existed in our traditions but we never paid attention to it. It’s a modern style of poetry – hip hop… It’s not about forming a hip hop culture in Lebanon, it exists in Zajal and Atabah… hip hop already existed in Lebanon." – MC Edd Abbas

Atabah ( Arabic: عتابة) is a form of improvised Arabic poetry that uses the lyrical nature of the Arabic language in its performance.

Modern Lebanese hip hop artists have a different view on the significance of hiphop to the Lebanese culture specifically. "it highlights the message. It provides a framework to show the way, a notebook. It is not only a song, it is a framework." – Jamul

Chyno with a why?, a pioneer in the Middle Eastern hiphop scene states that hiphop in the region has accomplished a very important role in regards to youth dissilusionment, he states that hip hop "reduce pressure and stress”, in addition to “empower young people that do not fit in the society.”  – Chyno with a why

Accompaniment

The music underneath the lyrical portion of songs in Lebanese hip hop varies widely. African drumming is prevalent, along with the sound of bombshells and other street noises. Lebanese rapper Rayess Bek even includes a full orchestra with traditional instruments like the [oud] and [nay] in a recent album. Other influences include swing, jazz, reggae, and acoustic guitar tapping.

Popular Artists 

 Fared ( lm2ases ) 
 Abou Layla Lzir
 Basbous
 Boo Omar
 Blue Fiefer
 Bu Nasser Touffar
 Chyno with a why?
 Dizaster
 Edd Abbas
 El Rass
 El Shai5 S3aibes
 Jaafar al-Touffar
 K.A.R.L
 Kalach
 T-Rex
 Mad Hurtz
 Jamul (Formerly known as M.O.E Jammoul)
 Muhandas
 Nizar Zgheib (ABS)
 Raji 88
 Rayess Bek
 Salloum
 Samarani
 Shaba7
 Ziggy Stoner
 Mano
 Charbel
 Lana Force
 Empera

See also
Arabic hip hop

References